Canyon Diablo (Navajo: Kin Łigaaí) is a canyon near Two Guns in Northern Arizona. Part of it is located on the Navajo Nation.

Discovery 
Canyon Diablo was named by U.S. Army Lieutenant Amiel Weeks Whipple. Whipple, of the Army's Topographical Engineers, made a survey in 1853–1854 along the 35th parallel. In mid December 1853 Whipple found a steep canyon while riding west from a point near Winslow with a reconnaissance party. He named it Canyon Diablo.

Consequently, the meteorite that caused the crater is officially called the Canyon Diablo meteorite.

Canyon Diablo ("devil canyon") is the Spanish translation of the Native American name. The Canyon Diablo Bridge, once used by U.S. Route 66 to cross the canyon south of the present I-40 bridges, is on the National Register of Historic Places.

The BNSF Canyon Diablo railroad bridge is a well-known railfan site.

See also

 List of historic properties in Two Guns, Arizona

References

Further reading
 Cline, Platt (1976). They Came to the Mountain,  Northern Arizona University and Northland Press 

Canyons and gorges of Arizona
Landforms of Coconino County, Arizona